Guichenotia intermedia is a flowering plant in the family Malvaceae and is endemic to Western Australia. It is a small shrub with hairy leaves and mauve-pink flowers.

Description

Taxonomy and naming
Guichenotia intermedia was first formally described in 2003 by  Carolyn F. Wilkins and the description was published in Australian Systematic Botany.The specific epithet (intermedia) means "coming between".

Distribution and habitat
This species of guichenotia is found on scrublands, roadsides, sandy flats and coastal heath from Kalbarri and north to Shark Bay.

References

Byttnerioideae
Malvales of Australia
Rosids of Western Australia
Plants described in 2003